The first series of Line of Duty, consisting of five episodes, began broadcasting on 26 June 2012 on BBC Two. The series follows the actions of Superintendent Ted Hastings (Adrian Dunbar), DC Kate Fleming (Vicky McClure) and DS Steve Arnott (Martin Compston) as they lead an investigation into the corrupt actions of DCI Tony Gates (Lennie James). Supporting characters include DS Matthew Cottan (Craig Parkinson) and DC Nigel Morton (Neil Morrissey). The series is created and written by Jed Mercurio.

Cast

Main cast 
 Lennie James as DCI Tony Gates
 Martin Compston as DS Steve Arnott
 Vicky McClure as DC Kate Fleming

Supporting cast 

 Adrian Dunbar as Superintendent Ted Hastings
 Craig Parkinson as DS Matthew "Dot" Cottan
 Neil Morrissey as DC Nigel Morton
 Gina McKee as Jackie Laverty
 Kate Ashfield as Jools Gates
 Heather Craney as DCI Alice Prior
 Brian McCardie as Tommy Hunter
 Gregory Piper as Ryan Pilkington
 Lauren O'Rourke as Keely Pilkington
 Tomi May as Miroslav Minkowicz
 Elliot Rosen as Terry Boyle
 Claire Keelan as DS Leah Janson
 Nigel Boyle as DI Ian Buckells
 Faraz Ayub as DC Deepak Kapoor
 Paul Higgins as Chief Superintendent Derek Hilton
 Owen Teale as Chief Inspector Philip Osborne
 Fiona Boylan as PC Karen Larkin
 Neet Mohan as PC Simon Bannerjee
 Darren Morfitt as PS Colin Brackley
 Marie Critchley as Jane Hargreaves, social worker
 Alison Lintott as Rita Bennett, civilian police investigator
 Elisa Lasowski as Nadzia Wojcik, waitress at the Sunflower Cafe
 Dylan Duffus as Wesley Duke
 Brian Miller as Alf Butterfield

Episodes

Reception 
The series received critical acclaim upon its release. Sonia Saraiya of the AV Club wrote “It's a complex world and there's a lot going on... That suggests that the show could even improve, as the audience gets to know the characters more. Either way, it is well worth watching”. Sarah Hughes of The Guardian wrote early in the series that the show was getting steadily stronger as each episode improved, though by the finale she criticised the pace, feeling some elements of the story felt “rushed”.

Censure by Ofcom
Following the complaint of one viewer, the media regulator Ofcom found the BBC had breached Rule 1.28 of the Code in 2012, specifically that there was a "serious lapse" in its duty of care for a 13-year-old actor, Gregory Piper, who had appeared in scenes which were "of a particularly violent nature and included sexually explicit language" by breaching broadcasting rules requiring that "due care must be taken over the physical and emotional welfare and the dignity of people under 18". In its full report, Ofcom cited the programme's failure to involve an independent expert, such as a child psychiatrist, to determine the actor's intellectual and emotional capacity to participate in the controversial scenes and that programme makers had not followed the best practice advice of the BBC's Editorial Policy Unit. However, the regulator found that there was no actual harm, distress or anxiety caused to the child actor.

Home entertainment releases 
Online
iTunes releases for Line of Duty
 

Blinkbox releases for Line of Duty

DVD
DVD releases for Line of Duty

Blu-ray
Blu-ray releases for Line of Duty

References 

Line of Duty
2012 British television seasons